Bantul is the capital of Bantul Regency in Indonesia. Bantul may also refer to
Persiba Bantul, a football club based in Bantul
Protaba Bantul, a football club based in Bantul
Bantul the Great, a Bengali comic strip character